Mula River is located in Balochistan, Pakistan. It is located at an elevation of 45 meters above sea level.

A dam, namely Naulong Dam, is currently under-construction on this river at Jhal Magsi, Pakistan. Farmers grow wheat, in every winter, around the river.

See also
 Naulong Dam

References

Jhal Magsi District
Rivers of Balochistan (Pakistan)
Rivers of Pakistan